Wagner Nunatak is one of the Rambo Nunataks, 850 m, standing 9 nautical miles (17 km) south of Blackburn Nunatak in the Pensacola Mountains. Mapped by United States Geological Survey (USGS) from surveys and U.S. Navy air photos, 1956–66. Named by Advisory Committee on Antarctic Names (US-ACAN) for John K. Wagner, radioscientist at Plateau Station, winter 1967.

Nunataks of Queen Elizabeth Land